The 2000 college football season may refer to:

 2000 NCAA Division I-A football season
 2000 NCAA Division I-AA football season
 2000 NCAA Division II football season
 2000 NCAA Division III football season
 2000 NAIA Football National Championship